Fort Saskatchewan-Vegreville is a provincial electoral district in Alberta, Canada. The district is mandated to return a single member to the Legislative Assembly of Alberta using the first-past-the-post method of voting.

The electoral district, which is located in rural east central Alberta just east of Edmonton, was created in the 2004 boundary redistribution. The current boundaries of the district comprise parts of Vegreville-Viking, Redwater and Clover Bar-Fort Saskatchewan. The district is named after the small city of Fort Saskatchewan and the town of Vegreville.

The current representative for this district is United Conservative Jackie Armstrong-Homeniuk who was first elected in the 2019 provincial election. The district has also been represented by past Progressive Conservative Premier Ed Stelmach.

History
The electoral district was created in the 2004 electoral boundary re-distribution from the old electoral districts of Clover Bar-Fort Saskatchewan, Redwater and Vegreville-Viking. The resulting population of the district in 2004 was 36,172, which was 1.5% above the provincial average of 35,951.

The 2010 electoral boundary re-distribution saw significant changes made to the district with land residing in Beaver County south of Tofield being moved to Battle River-Wainwright and land in Strathcona County north of Alberta Highway 16 being transferred into the electoral district from the old Strathcona electoral district.

The 2017 electoral boundary re-distribution saw a number of changes to the Fort Saskatchewan-Vegreville electoral district as four divisions in the central northeast area of the province (north and east of Edmonton) were consolidated into three to account for the population in those areas having grown at a rate below that of the province as a whole. The district would include the entirety of the Counties of Lamont and Minburn as well as Elk Island National Park. The resulting population of the district in 2017 was 52,141, 11% above provincial average for electoral districts. This variance was justified as population growth in the region is expected to continue to be less than the provincial rate of growth. The Commission noted the average age of residents in parts of the Fort Saskatchewan-Vegreville was well above that of other Albertans.

Boundary history

Electoral history
The electoral district of Fort Saskatchewan was created in the boundary redistribution of 2004. The first election held in the district saw longtime Vegreville—Viking incumbent Ed "The Sock" Stelmach win the new district of his party. He took just under half the popular vote, defeating four other candidates.

Stelmach became leader of the Progressive Conservatives and premier of the province in December 2006. He stood for re-election in 2008 winning a landslide of nearly 78% of the popular vote. Progressive Conservative Jacquie Fenske won the district in the 2012 provincial election.

In the 2015 election, NDP candidate Jessica Littlewood won with a majority of 2,870, defeating Jacquie Fenske who finished second. Littlewood would stand for re-election in 2019, however she would be defeated by UCP candidate Jackie Armstrong-Homeniuk by the considerable margin of 6,443 votes.

Legislature results

2004 general election

2008 general election

2012 general election

2015 general election

2019 general election

Senate nominee results

2004 Senate nominee election district results
Voters had the option of selecting four candidates on the ballot

2012 Senate nominee election district results

Student Vote results

2004 election

On November 19, 2004, a student vote was conducted at participating Alberta schools to parallel the 2004 Alberta general election results. The vote was designed to educate students and simulate the electoral process for persons who have not yet reached the legal majority. The vote was conducted in 80 of the 83 provincial electoral districts with students voting for actual election candidates. Schools with a large student body that reside in another electoral district had the option to vote for candidates outside of the electoral district then where they were physically located.

References

External links
Website of the Legislative Assembly of Alberta

Alberta provincial electoral districts
Fort Saskatchewan
Two Hills, Alberta
2003 establishments in Alberta
Constituencies established in 2003